Szymonowicz or Szymonowic is a Polish-language surname. It is a patronymic surname derived from the given name Szymon. Notable people with this surname include:

Dawid Szymonowicz
Szymon Szymonowic a.k.a. Simon Szymonowicz
Jerzy Szymonowicz

References

Polish-language surnames
Patronymic surnames
Surnames from given names